Joseph Carroll McCormick (December 15, 1907 – November 2, 1996) was an American prelate of the Roman Catholic Church who served as bishop of the Diocese of Altoona-Johnstown in Pennsylvania (1960-1966) and bishop of the Diocese of Scranton in Pennsylvania (1966-1983).

In a 2018 grand jury report, McCormick was criticized for his mishandling of sexual abuse allegations against priests when he was Bishop of the Diocese of Scranton.

Biography

Early life
McCormick was born in Philadelphia, Pennsylvania, on December 15, 1907. He studied at St. Charles Borromeo Seminary in the Overbrook section of Philadelphia and at the Pontifical Roman Seminary in Rome.

Priesthood 
McCormick was ordained to the priesthood for the Archdiocese of Philadelphia by his uncle, Cardinal Dennis  Dougherty, on July 10, 1932. McCormick served as vice-chancellor, and later chancellor (1936-1944), of the archdiocese. On June 24, 1940, while serving as Chancellor, McCormick offered the benediction at the closing of the second session of the 1940 Republican National Convention in Philadelphia. He became pastor of St. Stephen's Parish in Philadelphia in 1944.

Auxiliary Bishop of Philadelphia 
On January 11, 1947, McCormick was appointed as an auxiliary bishop of the Archdiocese of Philadelphia and as titular bishop of Ruspae by Pope Pius XII. He received his episcopal consecration on April 23, 1947, from Cardinal Dougherty, with Bishops Hugh L. Lamb and Eugene J. McGuinness serving as co-consecrators.

Bishop of Altoona-Johnstown 
McCormick was named Bishop of the Diocese of Altoona-Johnstown on June 25, 1960 by Pope Paul VI.  McCormick attended the Second Vatican Council from 1962 to 1965.

Bishop of Scranton 
McCormick was appointed Bishop of the Diocese of Scranton by Paul VI on March 4, 1966.

Retirement and legacy 
On February 15, 1983, Pope John Paul II accepted McCormick's letter of resignation as Bishop of Scranton. He died on November 2, 1996, at age 89.

In 2018, a grand jury investigating the handling of sexual abuse cases in Pennsylvania by the Catholic Church was released.  The report described several instances in the Diocese of Scranton in which parents, a police officer and other clergy reported sexual assault or inappropriate behaviors by priests to the diocese.  McCormick never notified parishioners or authorities about these allegations, but either dismissed them or reassigned the offending priests to different parishes.

On August 21, 2018, King's College in Wilkes Barre, Pennsylvania announced that they were removing McCormick's name from the building housing the chapel and the campus ministry.  This was in reaction to revelations that McCormick had protected priests accused of sexually abusing children.  The University of Scranton also announced that it was renaming its McCormick Hall due to the same reasons as King's College.

References

1907 births
Pontifical Roman Seminary alumni
1996 deaths
Participants in the Second Vatican Council
St. Charles Borromeo Seminary alumni
Clergy from Philadelphia
20th-century Roman Catholic bishops in the United States